Cottonwood Creek may refer to:

United States

California
Cottonwood Creek (Encinitas)
Cottonwood Creek (Inyo County, California)
Cottonwood Creek (Kern County)
Cottonwood Creek (Sacramento River tributary)
Cottonwood Creek (San Diego County)
Cottonwood Creek (San Luis Creek tributary)

Missouri
Cottonwood Creek (Little Tabo Creek tributary)
Cottonwood Creek (Wakenda Creek tributary)

Elsewhere
Cottonwood Creek (Verdigre Creek tributary), Nebraska
Cottonwood Creek (Cimarron River tributary), Oklahoma
Cottonwood Creek (Guadalupe County), Texas

See also
Cottonwood Creek Archeological Site (disambiguation)
Cottonwood Creek Bridge (disambiguation)
Cottonwood Creek Ranch Airport, Malheur County, Oregon